"Young Love (Strong Love)" is a song written by Kent Robbins and Paul Kennerley, and recorded by American country music duo The Judds.  It was released in February 1989, as the first single from their album River of Time.  In May, it became The Judds' 13th No. 1 hit on the Billboard magazine Hot Country Singles chart.

Content
The song chronicles a relationship between a young couple, beginning from the first time a young woman lays eyes on a man; according to the lyrics, she was "sitting cross-legged on the hood of a Ford, filing down her nails with an emery board." As the song continues, the boy—whose name is Billy—and girl — never named in the song — meet and the relationship blossoms into love. Eventually, the two are married, have a baby and move into a house on the edge of town.

Chart positions
"Young Love" debuted on the U.S. Billboard Hot Country Singles & Tracks for the week of February 25, 1989.

Year-end charts

Sources

1989 singles
The Judds songs
Songs written by Kent Robbins
Songs written by Paul Kennerley
RCA Records singles
Curb Records singles
Song recordings produced by Brent Maher
1989 songs